The Wabash Railroad Bridge is a historic structure located south of Pella, Iowa, United States. The Des Moines and St. Louis Railroad (D&S) was built through the central part of Marion County in 1882. This bridge was probably built at that time. It is a three span, wrought iron, Pratt through truss manufactured by the Carnegie Steel Company. The Wabash, St. Louis and Pacific Railroad, the Wabash Railroad, eventually acquired the D&S and this bridge. It remained in use as a railroad bridge until about 1946 when the county acquired the bridge and the right-of-way for a county road. They rehabilitated it in 1951, replacing part of the substructure. The bridge was listed on the National Register of Historic Places in 1998.

References

Bridges completed in 1882
Bridges in Marion County, Iowa
National Register of Historic Places in Marion County, Iowa
Road bridges on the National Register of Historic Places in Iowa
Truss bridges in Iowa
Wrought iron bridges in the United States
Pratt truss bridges in the United States